André Bernard (29 August 1930 – 15 December 2015) was a French racing cyclist. He rode in the 1952 Tour de France.

References

1930 births
2015 deaths
French male cyclists
Place of birth missing